The 1905–06 Niagara Purple Eagles men's basketball team represented Niagara University during the 1905–06 college men's basketball season. The head coach was Charles McGrath, coaching his first season with the Purple Eagles.

Schedule

|-

References

Niagara Purple Eagles men's basketball seasons
Niagara
Niagara Purple Eagles men's basketball
Niagara Purple Eagles men's basketball